Khaled Negm (Arabic: خالد نجم) was the Egyptian minister of communications and information technology from March to September 2015.

References

Communications Ministers of Egypt
Living people
IBM people
Year of birth missing (living people)